Pashupati Sharma is a Nepalese folk singer born on 31 October 1982 in Putalibazar Municipality Ward Number 3 of Syangja District, Nepal. Sharma moved to Kathmandu on 2003 for his further studies, as he was interested in singing. He started singing in Saptakoshi Dohori Sanjh (a duet folk singing club) and released his first official song on 2003. Sharma has already sung more than 200 songs during his career. His songs revolves around patriotism, love and satire. One of his latest satire song Lutna Sake Lut was recently forced to remove from YouTube. He is the living legend of folk music industry of Nepal. In 2018 he released song "Chhata harayo" with Devi Gharti Magar.
Ni next he is going to collab new song with Roshan Regmi from nawalpur in 2079 baisakh.

Awards 

 Image Award for Best Folk Dohori Song
 Radio Kantipur Music Award for Best Folk Singer

References 

Living people
Nepalese folk singers
21st-century Nepalese male singers
1982 births
People from Syangja District
Dohori singers